Daguao is a barrio in the municipality of Ceiba, Puerto Rico. Its population in 2010 was 235.

History
Puerto Rico was ceded by Spain in the aftermath of the Spanish–American War under the terms of the Treaty of Paris of 1898 and became an unincorporated territory of the United States. In 1899, the United States Department of War conducted a census of Puerto Rico finding that the combined population of Daguao and Río Abajo barrios (counted with Fajardo) was 1,099.

The old Roosevelt Roads Naval Base is near Daguao, and 40% of the land in Daguao has been designated as conservation land. This extensive protected natural area is home to ecosystems such as wetlands, estuaries, mangrove forests, coral systems, marine habitats, riverbanks and dry forests. Los Machos wetland in Daguao makes up the 10% mangroves that remain in Puerto Rico.

Sectors
Barrios (which are roughly comparable to minor civil divisions) in turn are further subdivided into smaller local populated place areas/units called sectores (sectors in English). The types of sectores may vary, from normally sector to urbanización to reparto to barriada to residencial, among others.

The following sectors are in Daguao barrio:

.

See also

 List of communities in Puerto Rico
 List of barrios and sectors of Ceiba, Puerto Rico

References

Barrios of Ceiba, Puerto Rico